The men's 5000 metres at the 2022 World Athletics Championships was held at the Hayward Field in Eugene from 21 to 24 July 2022.

Summary

The podium from the previous championships all returned. Muktar Edris was now ranked #13 in the world, Selemon Barega #3 and Mohammed Ahmed #4. Olympic Champion and world record holder Joshua Cheptegei was #1.  And there was Jakob Ingebrigtsen with no ranking at all and a chip on his shoulder after losing the 1500 earlier in the Championships.

From the start, Cheptegei went to the front to control the race.  He was marked by Luis Grijalva, Jacob Krop and Grant Fisher through three 62 second laps. Then Cheptegei let off the gas, the Kenyans decided to move forward, Krop taking the point, Nicholas Kipkorir dropped in behind him, Daniel Ebenyo came along the outside of the pack to join them.  But the pace dropped to 65 second laps. Grijalva and Cheptegei both made minor attempts to displace one of the Kenyans but they would have none of that.  After 5 laps, Kipkorir took the lead while Krop dropped back, then he dropped back a little more and the roadblock was broken. Meanwhile, Ingebrigtsen made a leisurely jog along the outside to join the front group, taking a wide detour out to lane 4 for water, only joined by Cheptegei and Edris before dropping in next to Grijalva behind Kipkorir. For the next  four laps, the Kenyan cast of leaders kept changing as one would drop back into the pack then rush back to the front while another would drop back.  With a kilometer to go, Ingebrigtsen took a shift at the front. Krop made one more effort to take the lead, but no, Ingebrigtsen felt he wanted to be there and would not let him pass again keeping Krop to the outside as the pace got faster and faster. Down the final backstretch, Fisher worked his way past Kipkorir into third, with Ahmed behind him. Through the final turn, Ingebrigtsen separated from the pack and after he had 7 metres, looking back to make sure there was no trouble coming to take his easy win. Behind him, Krop moved to the rail through the turn. With Ahmed passing on his outside, Fisher stepped on the rail with 120 metres to go, losing his balance and momentum. Ahmed and Oscar Chelimo went by, then Grijalva moving faster than any of them. In lane 3, Chelimo ran past Ahmed, who strained for the finish line. As he dived for the finish, Grijalva pipped him for fourth but his closing speed couldn't catch Chelimo.

Records
Before the competition records were as follows:

Qualification standard
The standard to qualify automatically for entry was 13:13.50.

Schedule
The event schedule, in local time (UTC−7), was as follows:

Results

Heats 
The first 5 athletes in each heat (Q) and the next 5 fastest (q) qualify for the final.

Final 
The final was started on 24 July at 18:05.

References

5000
5000 metres at the World Athletics Championships